Tak or TAK may refer to:

Places 
 Dağdöşü or Tak, Azerbaijan, a village
 Taq, Iran or Tak, a village
 Tak province, Thailand
 Tak, Thailand, capital of the province

Entertainment 
Total Annihilation: Kingdoms or TA:K
 Tak, title character of Tak and the Power of Juju, a video game, and Tak and the Power of Juju (TV series)
 Tak (Stephen King), a character in novels by King
 Tak, a character in Invader Zim
 Tak, a character from the novel Lord of Light by Roger Zelazny
 Tak (game), an abstract strategy board game
 TAK ensemble, a New York City-based contemporary chamber ensemble

Transport 
 Takamatsu Airport's IATA code
 Tallinna Autobussikoondis
 Tai Koo station's station code in Hong Kong
 Tatarstan Airlines's ICAO code

People
 Tak (surname), a Dutch, English, Indian, and Korean surname, including a list of people with the surname
 Tak (given name), a list of people with the given name or nickname
 Seomoon Tak, stage name of South Korean rock singer Lee Su-jin (born 1978)
 Young Tak, South Korean singer, songwriter, actor and television personality Park Young-tak (born 1983)

Other uses 
 Tak (function), in mathematics
 Tak F.C., a football club in Tak Province, Thailand
 Taal Aktie Komitee, the language action committee within the Flemish Movement
 Teyrêbazên Azadiya Kurdistan or Kurdistan Freedom Hawks

See also 
 Tak Dam (disambiguation)
 Taku (disambiguation)
 Takk (disambiguation)
 Tac (disambiguation)
 Tack (disambiguation)